Zoran Milinković may refer to:

Zoran Milinković (footballer) (born 1968), Serbian football manager and former player
Zoran Milinković (politician) (born 1956), member of Serbian Diaspora living in Paris